Alton B. Koistinen (born March 21, 1948) is an American former politician. He was served in the South Dakota House of Representatives from 2001 to 2008.

References

1948 births
Living people
People from Watertown, South Dakota
Businesspeople from South Dakota
Republican Party members of the South Dakota House of Representatives